Dragon's Claws is a dystopian science fiction comic book, published by Marvel Comics, as well as the eponymous law enforcers known as Dragon's Claws. It was set in the year 8162. Dragon's Claws first appeared in Dragon's Claws #1 (June 1988), and were created by Simon Furman and Geoff Senior.

Prior to their career as law enforcers, the Claws had been "the greatest Game players in the world" - the Game was a violent team sport, immensely popular and funded by the governing  World Development Council, who had used it to distract the population and reduce civil unrest. Many of the villains appearing in the series also have their roots in the Game.

Publication history
The regular series began in June 1988, intended as the flagship title for a line of American-format, monthly comics from Marvel UK. It was written by Simon Furman and drawn by Geoff Senior, Furman's first choice for artist and a collaborator on Marvel UK's Transformers. Original marketing for the comic in other Marvel UK comics called the team and comic Dragon's Teeth, but an independent comic already had the title. Shots of the cover to the first issue reflected this.

The series was promoted with the tagline "Earth, 8162. Not a nice place to live..."

The UK market was never big enough to support the series, which was cancelled due to low sales at #10. It was exported to America in limited numbers. Furman has said one reason for the failure was the size of the comic: the US monthly format was smaller than the standard A4 size of UK comics, meaning newsagents weren't sure where to place it and it was "lost" when placed with the A4 comics. The comic was also "quite explicitly brutal... boys love that kind of stuff", but this meant that it was quite likely "the parents of Transformers and Thundercats readers drew the line at Dragon's Claws."

Furman has said that the behind-the-scenes politics and sports-as-panacea plot of Rollerball, the costumed gangs of The Warriors, and the future dystopias of 2000 AD all had a strong influence on Claws, and "even the NURSE/Matron thing is an affectionate nod to Hattie Jacques and the Carry On movies I grew up with." Live Aid had a mark too, leaving "so the concept of starvation on a global scale... indelibly printed on my brain."

Plot
The story took place in 8162, and followed a team of former game players, the Claws, led by Dragon. The exact nature of the game is only hinted at, but it basically involves team members trying to get to a certain part of various ruined cityscapes, with the opposing team members trying absolutely anything to stop them. It was used as an opiate for the masses, to ease unrest about global concerns as the Earth moves closer to the sun.

At the start of the series, the game has been banned for the levels of violence involved, but Dragon, one of the most successful players, is having trouble adapting to civilian life with his wife, Tanya, who he lives with on a farm. He is contacted by Deller, an agent of N.U.R.S.E [National Union of Retired Sports Experts], who offers him, and his old team, the Claws, a role as government enforcers. Dragon initially declines, but when the farm is attacked by another former team, The Wildcats, he changes his mind. Unknown to him, the Wildcats has been hired by Deller for this purpose. A sub-plot dealt with the brother of a deceased Wildcat seeking vengeance against Deller, which resulted in Dragon's family being kidnapped when they were mistaken for Deller's family.

Dragon is reunited with the other Claws – Mercy (an ex-vigilante), Steel (a samurai honour-bound to Dragon since the latter saved his life in the Tokyo Riots of 8156), Digit (who had a computerised brain) and Scavenger (to quote, "No-one quite knows who or what Scavenger really is..."), and they are given a brief to stop the many former game teams who are causing trouble. Among these were The Vanishing Ladies, Split Infinity and the Jones Boys, but the recurring threat was the Evil Dead, led by Dragon's old nemesis Slaughterhouse.

Other adversaries were the mechanoid freelance peace-keeping agent Death's Head, who was hired by the surviving members of the Evil Dead, and was heavily damaged when he clashed with Dragon, leading to his redesign and leading into the launch of his own title, and a future take on the vigilante Scourge.

The main plotline concerns N.U.R.S.E's manipulation of the Claws, who were revealed to be involved in corrupt dealings and had actually reformed the Claws as "bully-boys" to take out and intimidate any gang that challenged N.U.R.S.E.. They deliberately kept Dragon from his family so he won't question his orders, eventually sending Deller to kill Dragon's wife; he was unable to do it, but his presence led to the family being abducted by another rogue Game team (who believed they were Deller's family and who had a grudge against him). Dragon eventually teamed up with Slaughterhouse and Deller in overcoming N.U.R.S.E's corrupt kingpin Matron in #9.

With N.U.R.S.E. closed down and the Claws directly under the control of the World Development Council, Dragon elects to stay on leading the Claws, with Deller now as part of the team.

The final issue, #10, left several plot threads dangling. Dragon is still unaware of much of Deller's part in the N.U.R.S.E. conspiracy (or that Deller has murdered a villain who knew the truth), while the fate of his wife, Tanya, last seen in a burning building, is unknown.

For the 2004 edition of the charity project Just One Page, Furman and artist Paul Ridgon created an epilogue/teaser for Dragon's Claws, which was later recoloured and reprinted in the 2008 trade paperback. It featured Dragon holding a defeated Slaughterhouse at gunpoint, after a battle where Slaughterhouse was responsible for leading an army in sacking whole cities and killed two of the Claws. Dragon debated whether or not to simply kill his nemesis and end the conflict forever, or "play it by the book one last time" and live up to what the Claws are meant to represent. It was not revealed what decision he took.

Characters
The members of Dragon's Claws are:

Dragon, team leader - raised in an orphanage and showing great athletic and combat promise, Dragon was drawn to the Game. A tragedy involving his first team, the Courtland Rangers, caused Dragon to quit and led ex-mercenaries in war-torn Sudan. Injured and subsequently rehabilitated, he returned to the Game to form his own team, Dragon's Claws. The team were top of the league within six years, before they quit in 8156, due to escalating violence in the Game. He has a wife Tanya and an adopted son Michael, although his family are estranged as a consequence of Dragon's return to the Claws. Very experienced in armed and unarmed combat. Driven by a sense of morality and respected even by his bitter enemies.
Mercy (Mercy Connaught) - the daughter of a wealthy industrialist, Mercy became a vigilante after her father's murder. As part of her search for her father's killer, she joined a minor league Game team, The Equalizers. After finally killing her father's murderer, she was arrested but surrendered into Dragon's "protective custody". Mercy generally fights with knives, but will use guns or other weapons when required.
Steel (Shonin Ikeda) - a Japanese strongman-samurai. Born in Kobe with a hyperactive system that transforms nutrients into muscle. After witnessing the death of his father, a Yakuza warlord, Steel joined up with Dragon when the latter saved his life in the Tokyo riots of 8156, (replacing an earlier team member, Megaton). A skilled swordsman with a strong sense of honour.
Digit (Gan Ayerson) - the team techie. A Scottish highlander possessing an exceptionally high IQ, Digit became a leading expert on computers until he was found seriously injured in a Game arena. His life was saved by his own technology, his eyes and brain now computerised and his intellect greatly enhanced, at a cost to his humanity. Heavily reliant on his back-mounted firepower, which includes a taser, energised baton and gas dispenser.
Scavenger - a mysterious and versatile fighter. Assumed to be of aboriginal descendency from the 'Austro-Zealand crosslands'. Believed to have worked as a fence for sky pirates in the North of England, before fighting in the 'Tunnel Wars' beneath Birmingham. Taken prisoner and sent to the Chaney maximum security prison, which collapsed into a fault line soon after. Scavenger became a lifeline for the other inmates, who suffered from agoraphobia, and during one of his supply runs, he rescued Dragon from another Game team, The Jesters. Ultimately abandoning the Chain Gang, Scavenger joined Dragon's Claws. During the team's mission to Channel City, he found and adopted a mongrel dog, Scratch.
Deller became a sixth member in #10.

Guest appearances
 Death's Head #2  - The mechanoid accepts an assignment working for the inmates of a prison where Scavenger was once held. Written by Simon Furman and drawn by Bryan Hitch (the only time the Claws weren't drawn by Senior). The story takes place between Dragon's Claws #7 and #8.

Collected editions
The series has been collected into a trade paperback:

 Dragon's Claws (collects Dragon's Claws #1-10 and Death's Head #2, paperback, 260 pages, Panini Comics, October 2008)

References

External links
 Dragon's Claws  at the Appendix to the Handbook of the Marvel Universe

Dragon's Claws at the Unofficial Handbook of Marvel Comics Creators

Dragon's Claws at the Big Comic Book DataBase
 Dragon's Claws at the International Catalogue of Superheroes
 Starburst retrospective interview about Dragon's Claws (November 2011)
 

1988 comics debuts
1989 comics endings
Comics characters introduced in 1988
Marvel UK teams
Works set in the future